The 2018–19 National Basketball League (Bulgaria) season was the 78th season of the Bulgarian NBL. Balkan Botevgrad won its fifth national title.

Teams

The same nine teams of the previous seasons repeated participation in the 2018–19 edition.

Regular season
In the regular season, teams play against each other three times home-and-away in a double round-robin format. The eight first qualified teams advance to the playoffs.

League table

Results

Playoffs

Bracket

Quarterfinals

Levski Lukoil v Academic Sofia

Academic Bultex 99 v Rilski Sportist

Beroe v Yambol

Balkan v Spartak Pleven

Semifinals

Finals

Player of the round

Bulgarian clubs in European competitions

NBL clubs in regional competitions

References

External links
NBL official website 
Player Stats

National Basketball League (Bulgaria) seasons
Bulgarian
Basketball